Young Rewired State (often styled as YRS) was an organisation based in the United Kingdom, which ran events and schemes for technically gifted young people aged 18 and under. It brought together young developers, designers, and those with other technical skills to build projects (mainly phone and web applications) to attempt to solve real world problems. Many developers who participated in Young Rewired State events learned coding skills outside the traditional school curriculum.

Young Rewired State was founded in 2009 by Emma Mulqueeny, James Darling, and Richard Pope. It was initially run as an annual event by its sister organisation Rewired State. The former Managing Director of Young Rewired State was Ruth Nicholls, a law graduate from Cambridge University.

The last event run by Young Rewired State was the 2015 Festival of Code, and the organisation was formally dissolved in February 2019.

Festival of Code 

Between 2009 and 2015, Young Rewired State held a national hackathon where attendees across the UK took part in a competition to make an application including at least one piece of open government data. This event was initially called "Young Rewired State", but was renamed in 2012 to the "Festival of Code". Young Rewired State also ran their "Hyperlocal" scheme from October 2014, which aimed to keep some of the local Festival centres open throughout the year, to provide ongoing support for young "digital makers".

According to an article by Emma Mulqueeny only around 5% of the participants were female at the 2012 festival, although this rose to over 30% by March 2015.

The Festival of Code that would have occurred in 2016 was initially postponed until 2017, but ultimately did not occur.

Hyperlocal 
Throughout the year, Young Rewired State ran various "Hyperlocal" centres across the UK, which provide coding challenges across the year, rather than being focused on one week as the Festival of Code is. Hyperlocal generally had fewer centres operating than the Festival of Code, with 21 operating as of 25 July 2015, although it did have three operating outside of the UK.

References 

Festival of Code

Computer clubs in the United Kingdom
Computer programming
Digital divide
Education in England
Software development events